The 1970–71 Virginia Squires season was the first season of the Virginia Squires in the American Basketball Association. After one season each in Oakland and Washington, owner Earl Foreman was convinced by the league to move his team to Virginia. Like the Carolina Cougars and The Floridians, the Squires played as a regional franchise, primarily playing games in Norfolk, Hampton and Richmond, with Salem and Roanoke having occasional games. The Squires started play on October 17, 1970, in Norfolk, winning 133–116 over the Pittsburgh Condors. They proceeded to win their next five games, while having a 30–12 first half of the season, highlighted by a seven-game winning streak. They went 25–17 in the second half, though they never lost more than two games in a row. They finished 1st in points scored at 123.3 per game, but 7th in points allowed at 119.7 per game. In the playoffs, they beat the Kentucky Colonels in six games to advance to the Division Finals, but they were beaten in six games themselves by the New York Nets.

Prior to the season on September 1, the Squires traded an unhappy Rick Barry to the New York Nets for $200,000 cash.  Offsetting this loss was rookie Charlie Scott from the University of North Carolina.  Scott averaged 27.1 points per game and was named ABA Rookie of the Year.

Roster
20 Mike Barrett – Point guard
11 Larry Brown – Point guard
16 Bill Bunting – Small forward
34 Frank Card – Forward
40 George Carter – Small forward
42 Jim Eakins – Center
31 George Irvine – Small forward
24 Neil Johnson – Power forward
34 Mike Maloy – Power forward
15 Doug Moe – Small forward
33 Charlie Scott – Shooting guard
22 Ray Scott- Center
14/54 Roland Taylor – Point guard
54 Ron Taylor – Center

Final standings

Eastern Division

Playoffs
Eastern Division Semifinals vs. New York Nets

Squires win series, 4–2

Eastern Division Finals vs. Kentucky Colonels

Squires lose series, 4–2

Awards and honors
1971 ABA All-Star Game selections (game played on January 23, 1971) 
Charlie Scott
George Carter
Neil Johnson
Bianchi was selected to coach the Eastern Division.
ABA Coach of the Year: Al Bianchi
ABA Rookie of the Year: Charlie Scott
ABA First Team selection: Charlie Scott

References

 Squires on Basketball Reference

External links
 RememberTheABA.com 1970–71 regular season and playoff results
 Virginia Squires page

Virginia Squires
Virginia Squires
Virginia Squires, 1970–71
Virginia Squires, 1970–71